Sher Singh (English:Tiger Singh) is a 2019 Indian, Bhojpuri language action romance drama film directed by Shashank Rai and jointly produced by Shashank Rai, Gayatri Kesharwani and Madhwesh Rai with co-produced by 2 Brothers Film (Thakur Vijay Singh). It stars Pawan Singh and Amrapali Dubey in the lead roles, while Aayushi Tiwari, Ashok Samarth, Brijesh Tripathi, Sanjay Verma, Jaswant Kumar, Ajay Suryavanshi, Sweety Singh, Mukesh Tiwari, Rajveer Yadav, Jai Singh, Vijay Singh and Vikash Tiwari in supporting roles. Sambhavna Seth make a special appearance in this film.

Cast
Pawan Singh
Amrapali Dubey
Ayushi Tiwari
Brijesh Tripathi
 Ashok Samarth
Sanjay Verma
Jaswant Kumar
Ajay Suryavanshi
Sweety Singh
Glory Mohanta
Mukesh Tiwari
Rajveer Yadav
Jai Singh
Vijay Singh
Deepak Singh
Vikas Tiwari
Balgovind Banjara
Mahi Kanani

Production
The film was shot in beautiful location of Mumbai, Jodhpur, Lucknow and Bangkok. The film's producer and director is Shashank Rai. Sambhavna Seth's appearance will be seen in the film. The story is written by Veeru Thakur. In the film, Ashok Samarth will be seen in the lead role along with Pawan Singh and Amrapali Dubey. Singers are Pawan Singh, Priyanka Singh and Alka Jha. DOP is Sudhanshu Shekhar. Fight done Mallesh and EP is by Rajveer Yadav. film is scheduled to release in Durga Pooja 2019 in all theatres.

Music
Music of "Sher Singh" is composed by Chhote Baba with lyrics penned by Manoj Matlabi, Sumit Chandravanshi and Dharm Hindustani. It is produced under the "Yashi Films", who also bought his satellite rights.

Marketing
First-look poster of this film released on 6 September 2019 at official Instagram handle of actress Amrapali Dubey.
Trailer of this film is released on 15 September 2019 on official YouTube handel of "Yashi Films", who also bought his satellite rights. Trailer crossed over 2 million views in just on day.

References

2010s Bhojpuri-language films